Olivier Mutis defeated Nicolas Kiefer in the final, 6–2, 6–2 to win the boys' singles tennis title at the 1995 Wimbledon Championships.

Seeds

  Nicolas Kiefer (final)
  Eyal Erlich (third round)
  Alejandro Hernández (semifinals)
  Jamie Delgado (second round)
  Mariano Puerta (second round)
 n/a
  Lee Jong-min (first round)
  Ulrich Jasper Seetzen (third round)
  Martin Lee (quarterfinals)
  Michal Tabara (second round)
  Daniel de Melo (first round)
  Jean-François Bachelot (semifinals)
  Fredrik Jonsson (first round)
  Boris Borgula (third round)
  Michel Kratochvil (first round)
  Tommy Haas (second round)

Draw

Finals

Top half

Section 1

Section 2

Bottom half

Section 3

Section 4

References

External links

Boys' Singles
Wimbledon Championship by year – Boys' singles